Isaac Van Zandt (July 10, 1813 – October 11, 1847) was a political leader in the Republic of Texas. Van Zandt County, Texas, was named in his honor.

Early life
Van Zandt was born on July 10, 1813 in Franklin County, Tennessee to Jacob and Mary Isaacs Van Zandt. The Van Zandt family had migrated to America from the Netherlands prior to the American Revolutionary War.

Career
Van Zandt went into a joint business venture with his father by opening a store. Van Zandt later moved to Coffeeville, Mississippi, where he opened his own store. After experiencing financial difficulties after the depression of 1837, Van Zandt became interested in a debate society which enabled him to use his natural talent for public speaking. This spurred an interest in law and within a year he was a member of the Mississippi bar.

Van Zandt came to the Republic of Texas in 1838 and settled in Elysian Fields in what was then Panola County. In 1839 he moved to what is now Marshall, Texas.

Van Zandt was the representative of Harrison County in the House of Representatives of the Republic of Texas from 1840 until 1842, when Sam Houston appointed him Republic of Texas Chargé d'Affaires in Washington, DC. In 1841 Van Zandt donated land, along with Peter Whetestone, to create a county seat for Harrison County. Van Zandt named the new city in honor of the Chief Justice of the U.S. Supreme Court John Marshall. As the Republic of Texas ambassador to the United States Van Zandt was instrumental in crafting the Annexation Treaty of the Republic of Texas to the U.S.

Van Zandt returned to Texas in 1845 to serve as a delegate to the Texas state constitutional convention.

Personal life, death and legacy
Van Zandt married Frances Lipscomb in 1833.

Van Zandt died during a yellow fever epidemic in Houston while campaigning for governor in 1847. The Van Zandt family donated their plantation as the site for the College of Marshall (now East Texas Baptist University) in 1912. In 1936 a memorial was constructed in Canton, the seat of Van Zandt County.  Isaac Van Zandt was the father of Texas politician and businessman K. M. Van Zandt and his sister Ida Van Zandt Jarvis, a generous benefactor and the first female trustee of Texas Christian University (TCU).  Isaac was also the great-great-great-grandfather of country music songwriter and performer Townes Van Zandt.

External links
Papers, 1774-1953 and undated, of son Khleber Miller Van Zandt in the Southwest Collection/Special Collections Library at Texas Tech University

References

1813 births
1847 deaths
Deaths from yellow fever
People from Marshall, Texas
Infectious disease deaths in Texas
People from Franklin County, Tennessee
People from Coffeeville, Mississippi
American city founders
Political office-holders in the Republic of Texas
American people of Dutch descent